Cockfosters is a suburb of north London to the east of Chipping Barnet, lying partly in the London Borough of Enfield and partly in the London Borough of Barnet. Before 1965, it was in the counties of Middlesex and Hertfordshire.

Origins and popular attractions
The name was recorded as far back as 1524 and is thought to be either the name of a family or that of a house which stood on Enfield Chase. One suggestion is that it was "the residence of the cock forester (or chief forester)".

Of note in Cockfosters is Trent Park, now a country park. Christ Church, Cockfosters, an Anglican evangelical church, was founded in 1839. Christ the King, Cockfosters (Vita et Pax), a Catholic church, was founded in 1930.  The Piccadilly line of the London Underground reached Cockfosters in 1933. The Cock Inn (formerly the Cock), off Cockfosters Road on Chalk Lane, opened in 1798.

Geography

Education
Southgate School is located on Sussex Way.

Trent C of E Primary School is located on Chalk Lane.

Theatre and the arts
The Chickenshed Theatre Company, founded in 1975 in a chicken shed before relocating to its current site, originated the concept of inclusive theatre.

Sport and leisure

Cockfosters has a non-League football club, Cockfosters F.C., which plays at the Cockfosters Sports Ground.

The Saracens used to play at Chase Side (also known as Clocktower Park); however, they are now based in Hendon. The ground is still used for Enfield F.C. training and for the Saracens' 'B' team, Saracens Storm. It is also used as Saracens Amateurs' training ground.

Cockfosters Cricket Club and Southgate Compton Cricket Club play at Chalk Lane on fields adjacent to Christ Church, either side of Cockfosters Bowling Club.

Trent Country Park covers approximately 320 hectares (791 acres, 1.2 sq mi) and features treetop adventure park Go Ape.

Demographics

Cockfosters has its own electoral ward in the Enfield borough. The 2011 census of Cockfosters ward counted a population of 16,137. The ethnic composition was 73.7% white (51.7% British, 19.7% Other, 2.2% Irish), 13.5% Asian (6.5% Indian), and 8% black (2.9% African). The most spoken foreign languages were Turkish and Greek. Fifty per cent of the population were Christians, with Muslims and Jews forming 10% and 9% respectively. Of the 5,215 households, 3,219 resided in a whole house or bungalow; 68.8% of home tenures were owned, with minorities of privately rented and socially rented homes. Of economically active people, 4.2% were unemployed. The median age was forty years. The part within the borough of Barnet is covered by the East Barnet ward.

Culture 

Cockfosters is the name of a 2015 short-story collection by Helen Simpson.  One of the short stories features a visit to "lost property" at Cockfosters Underground station.  The poet John Betjeman, who taught at Heddon Court School in 1929–30, wrote "The Cricket Master" about his experiences there.

People
The Member of Parliament (MP) for Enfield Southgate from 2005 to 2017, David Burrowes, was born in Cockfosters.  George Baillie Duncan ministered at Christ Church, Cockfosters, and the cricketer Andrew Wingfield Digby was a curate there.  Cameron McVey grew up in Cockfosters.  Other transient residents have included the footballers Tommy Docherty and George Eastham and Dave Davies of the Kinks.  Professors John Stollery and Ian Jacobs also grew up in Cockfosters.

Transport
Two tube stations are located within Cockfosters:
 Cockfosters Station is the terminus of the Piccadilly line.
 Oakwood Station is the next station after Cockfosters.

London Buses routes 298, 299, 307, 384, 692, 699, N91 serve Cockfosters.

References

External links

 
Areas of London